Steenplaats is a hamlet  in the Dutch province of South Holland and is part of the municipality of Hoeksche Waard. Steenplaats lies a few hundred metres southeast of Strijen.

Steenplaats is not a statistical entity, and considered part of Strijen. It has no place name signs, and consists of about 70 houses.

References

Populated places in South Holland
Hoeksche Waard